Kosciuszko's Garden is a small retreat garden built by Tadeusz Kosciuszko on the side of a cliff overlooking the Hudson River at West Point, New York.  First constructed in 1778, it still offers visitors and cadets a place of quiet tranquility during the warmer months.  The "General Edward L. Rowny Family Endowment" was established to further sustain perpetual care and maintenance of the Garden and to dedicate a plaque commemorating the occasion.

Dr. James Thacher described it in his diary, "Colonel Thaddeus Kosciuszko, a gentleman of distinction from Poland...amused himself while stationed on the point, in laying out a curious garden in a deep valley, abounding more in rocks than soil.  I was gratified in viewing his curious water fountain with jets and cascades."

See also
Fort Clinton (West Point)
Constitution Island
Fort Putnam
Redoubt Four (West Point)

References

1778 establishments in New York (state)
Tadeusz Kościuszko
United States Military Academy
Gardens in New York (state)